Vaddeswaram is a census town in Guntur district of the Indian state of Andhra Pradesh.

Demographics 

 census, the town had a population of 6,275. The total population consists of 3,087 males and 3,188 females —a sex ratio of 1033 females per 1000 males. 598 children are in the age group of 0–6 years, of which 287 are boys and 311 are girls. The average literacy rate stands at 70.32% with 3,992 literates, relatively higher than the state average of 67.41%.

Transport 

Kolanukonda railway station serves Vaddeswaram with rail facility. It is situated on Howrah-Chennai main line and is administered under Vijayawada railway division of South Central Railways.

Education 
The primary and secondary school education is imparted by government, aided and private schools, under the School Education Department of the state. KL University is a deemed university located in this town.

See also 
List of census towns in Andhra Pradesh

References

External links 

Census towns in Andhra Pradesh